The 2001 Yonex All England Open was the 91st edition of the All England Open Badminton Championships. It was held from 7–11 March 2001, at the National Indoor Arena in Birmingham, England.

It was a four star tournament and the prize money was US$125,000.

Venue
National Indoor Arena

Final results

Men's singles

Section 1

Section 2

Women's singles

Section 1

Section 2

References

External links
Results 2001 All England Open

All England Open Badminton Championships
All England Open
All England
Sports competitions in Birmingham, West Midlands
March 2001 sports events in the United Kingdom